The men's 1000 meter at the 2021 KNSB Dutch Single Distance Championships took place in Heerenveen at the Thialf ice skating rink on Sunday 1 November 2020. There were 19 participants.

Statistics

Result

Source:

Referee: Berri de Jonge.  Assistant: Rieks van Lubek  Starter: Jan Rosing

Draw

References

Single Distance Championships
2021 Single Distance